Chondrocidaris is a genus of sea urchins of the family Cidaridae described in 1863 by Alexander Agassiz. There are two living species and several fossil species dating as far back as the Miocene.

Living species
Chondrocidaris brevispina (Clark, 1925)
Chondrocidaris gigantea (Agassiz, 1863)

Extinct species
Chondrocidaris clarkii
Chondrocidaris marianica
Chondrocidaris problepteryx

References

External links

Cidaridae
Cidaroida genera